The Magazines and TV Screens Tour (stylised as Magazine + TV Screens Tour) is a concert tour by Union J in support of their solo debut studio album Union J. The tour will be their first headlining tour in the United Kingdom, Ireland and Portugal.

Background
On 11 June 2013, Union J announced that they would be touring the United Kingdom and Ireland in support of their debut album, Union J. When asked about the tour, the band stated:
"The thing we love most about music is performing and we are so excited to get out on the road for our first ever tour. Playing our album to fans will be brilliant. We are so excited and promise to put on a really special show."

Tickets went on sale on 14 June 2013. The band added an extra date to Belfast on the tour.

Opening acts 
 Room 94
 5Angels
 Elyar Fox
 Ollie Marland
 Nagiiba Georgiou Abdulah
 D8 (X-Factor Portugal finalist)
 NO STRESS (Portuguese Band)

Set List
Where Are You Now
Beethoven
Head In The Clouds
Wild Ones/Roar (Katy Perry and Flo Rida cover) (George's Solo)
Carry You
Save The Last Dance
Lucky Ones
Listen (Beyoncé cover) (Jaymi's Solo)
Skyscraper (Demi Lovato cover)
Amaze Me
Counting Stars (OneRepublic cover) (JJ's Solo)
I Knew You Were Trouble/We Are Never Ever Getting Back Together/22/Love Story/Everything Has Changed (Taylor Swift cover)
Beneath Your Beautiful (Labrinth cover) (Josh's Solo)
Beautiful Life
Last Goodbye
Encore:
Loving You Is Easy

http://www.setlist.fm/setlist/union-j/2013/new-theatre-oxford-england-4bc5bbb2.html

Tour dates

Matinée and evening shows

References

2013 concert tours
2014 concert tours